The blue-tailed damselfly or common bluetail (Ischnura elegans) is a damselfly, belonging to the family Coenagrionidae.

Subspecies and varieties
Subspecies and varieties  include:
Ischnura elegans ebneri Schmidt, 1938 
Ischnura elegans elegans (Vander Linden, 1820) 
Ischnura elegans pontica Schmidt, 1939 
Ischnura elegans f. infuscans 
Ischnura elegans f. infuscans-obsoleta 
Ischnura elegans f. rufescens 
Ischnura elegans f. typica 
Ischnura elegans f. violacea

Distribution
This species is present in most of Europe and the middle-east. It is a common species.

Habitat

Description

Adult male blue-tailed damselflies have a head and thorax patterned with blue and black. There is a bi-coloured pterostigma on the front wings. Eyes are blue. They have a largely black abdomen with very narrow pale markings where each segment joins the next. Segment eight, however, is entirely pale blue. At rest, the wings of most damselfly species are held back together, unlike dragonflies, which rest with their wings out flat. The thorax of juvenile males has a green tinge.

Female blue-tailed Damselflies come in a variety of colour forms. Juveniles may be salmon pink, form rufescens; violet, form violacea and a pale green form. The colour darkens as the damselfly ages. Mature females may be blue like the male, form typica; olive green thorax and brown spot, form infuscans or pale brown thorax and brown spot, form infusca-obseleta.

Biology and behavior
Adults fly from April to September to early October. The adult damselflies prey on small flying insects, caught using their legs like a basket to scoop the prey up while flying, or insects taken from leaves. Damselfly nymphs are aquatic, and prey on small aquatic insects or other aquatic larvae.

A male can try to interfere with a mating pair, by attaching itself to the mating male. The females always lay their eggs on the floating parts of the plants without any involvement of the male.

Blue-tailed Damselflies are superb fliers and can alter each of their four wing's kinematics in order to maneuver. A recent study has shown  that they can compensate for a whole wing loss and even successfully maneuver and catch prey.

Gallery

References

External links
 
 

Ischnura
Damselflies of Europe
Insects described in 1820
Taxa named by Pierre Léonard Vander Linden
Articles containing video clips